A science fiction Western is a subgenre of science fiction, using a Western-inspired setting.

Since the characteristic elements of science fiction can occur in any setting, science fiction lends itself to combination with other genres. In 1953, J. B. Priestley described the "Western" as one of the three types of science fiction. The film serial The Phantom Empire has been cited as possibly the earliest science fiction Western primarily because it takes place on a dude ranch (with many of the props associated with conventional 19th century westerns) while showcasing technology not in existence during that period. Since then, science fiction Westerns have appeared in film, television, novels, comic books, and other media. The 2002 television series Firefly was described as a science fiction Western, since it combined the visual elements associated with Westerns (revolvers, horses, etc.) with those associated with science fiction; however, creator Joss Whedon said that the term made people "cringe". Deep Range by Arthur C. Clarke is considered another example.

Although sometimes used interchangeably with the term Space Western, film critic Lee Broughton notes the use of "traditional Western plots and settings" as the defining difference for the science-fiction Western proper.

Novels and stories
 Six-Gun Planet by John Jakes (1970)
 The Dark Tower series by Stephen King (1982-2004)
 Doctor Who:Peacemaker by James Swallow (2007)
 "Frontier Earth" by Bruce Boxleitner (1999)
 "Searcher" by Bruce Boxleitner (2001)
 The Ghosts of Watt O'Hugh by Steven S. Drachman (2011), which was named as one of the Best of 2011 by Kirkus Reviews
 The Alloy of Law by Brandon Sanderson
 Skirmish on a Summer Morning by Bob Shaw (1976 novelette)
 The Buntline Special by Mike Resnick (2010)
 Ninety Thousand Horses by Sean McMullen (2012 novelette)
 The Never-Ending Western Movie by Robert Sheckley (originally published Science Fiction Discoveries, 1976; included in the collection "The Robot Who Looked Like Me")

Comics
 Trigun by Yasuhiro Nightow
 Daisy Kutter by Kazu Kibuishi
 Lone by Stuart Moore and Jerome Opena
 Iron West by Doug Tennapel
 Cowboys & Aliens by Scott Mitchell Rosenberg
 High Moon by David Gallaher and Steve Ellis
 East of West by Jonathan Hickman and Nick Dragotta

Films
 Westworld (1973)
 Timerider: The Adventure of Lyle Swann (1982)
 Back to the Future Part III (1990)
 The Postman (1997)
 Wild Wild West (1999)
 Tremors 4: The Legend Begins (2004): A frontier town discovers monsters.
 Priest (2011)
 Cowboys & Aliens (2011)

Television
 The Wild Wild West (1965–69)
 Doctor Who: The Gunfighters (1966)
 The Time Tunnel: "Massacre", "The Alamo", "Visitors from Beyond the Stars" and "Billy the Kid" (1966/67)
 The Prisoner: "Living In Harmony"
 Star Trek: "Spectre of the Gun" (1968)
 Outlaws (1986/87)
 The Adventures of Brisco County, Jr. (1993/94)
 Legend (1995)
 Red Dwarf: "Gunmen of the Apocalypse" (1993)
 Outlaw Star by Mitsuru Hongo (1998)
 Trigun by Yasuhiro Nightow (1998)
 Wild Arms: Twilight Venom by Itsuro Kawasaki (1999)
 Star Trek: Enterprise: "North Star" (2003)
 Torchwood: Kiss Kiss, Bang Bang (2007)
 Doctor Who: A Town Called Mercy (2012)
 Westworld (2016-present)

Serial
 The Phantom Empire

Video games
 Bastion
 Borderlands
 Blood Bros.
 Darkwatch
 Deadlands
 Fallout: New Vegas
 Gunman Chronicles
 StarCraft II: Wings of Liberty
 SteamWorld Dig
 Tin Star
 Wild Arms
 Wild Guns

See also
 Cross-genre
 Weird West
 Space Western
 Steampunk

References

 
Science fiction genres
Western (genre) subgenres